By a Woman's Wit is a 1911 American silent film produced by Kalem Company. It was directed by Sidney Olcott with Jack J. Clark and Alice Hollister in the leading roles. A copy is kept in the Desmet collection at Eye Film Institute (Amsterdam).

Cast
 Jack J. Clark as Lieutenant Jaspers
 Robert Vignola 
 Alice Hollister as Pamela

Production notes
The film was shot in Jacksonville, Florida.

External links

 By a Woman's Wit website dedicated to Sidney Olcott
Film at YouTube

1911 films
Silent American drama films
American silent short films
American Civil War
Films set in Florida
Films shot in Jacksonville, Florida
Films directed by Sidney Olcott
1911 short films
1911 drama films
American black-and-white films
1910s American films